Jacob Butler (born 12 November 1984) is a New Zealand footballer who currently plays as a midfielder for National Premier Leagues Victoria club Brunswick City. He has also appeared for the New Zealand national football team. Butler was the captain of Waitakere United during its most successful period, winning the New Zealand national competition five times, including leading the team to four consecutive titles after taking over captaincy. Butler has played in seven editions of the OFC Champions League winning it twice, which also led to two appearances at the FIFA Club World Cup. Bulter is the leading appearance holder at Waitakere United, having played for the club since its first year of existence in 2004 until he left in 2019.

Career
On 2 June 2014, Butler joined Singaporean S-league team Tampines Rovers in the mid-season transfer window on a six-month contract. He scored his first goal for the club against Warriors FC in the Singapore League Cup. He went on to make 23 appearances scoring 4 goals, playing every minute of every scheduled match.

In January 2015 Butler returned to play for Waitakere United, signing mid-season after his stint in Singapore. Butler helped the team finish fourth after being in seventh place at the Christmas break. He played every minute of the remaining 11 games.

In April 2015 Butler signed a short-term deal with Team Wellington for the OFC Champions League tournament held in Fiji.

Mid season in May 2015, Butler agreed to take over as player–coach of Waitakere City FC who play in the NRFL Premier. This league runs in the winter instead of the summer like the New Zealand Football Championship. During his 2 seasons at the helm, Waitakere city won the league in 2016 and finished fourth respectively in 2017.

Before the start of the start of the 2019–20 season, Butler returned to New Zealand to play in the New Zealand Football Championship for the Hamilton Wanderers.

International career
Butler made his full All Whites debut in a 1–0 win over Saudi Arabia on 4 September 2013.

Honours
 New Zealand Football Championship (5): 2007–08, 2009–10, 2010–11, 2011–12, 2012–13
 OFC Champions League (2): 2007, 2007–08

References

External links
 
 

1984 births
Living people
New Zealand association footballers
New Zealand international footballers
Waitakere United players
Tampines Rovers FC players
Expatriate footballers in Singapore
Association football midfielders
Singapore Premier League players
New Zealand Football Championship players